National Park is a rural locality in the local government areas of Central Highlands and Derwent Valley in the Central and South-east regions of Tasmania. The 2016 census determined a population of 73 for the state suburb of National Park. National Park is the closest locality to Mount Field National Park.

History
National Park was gazetted as a locality in 1959.

Geography
The Tyenna River enters from the west and flows through to the north-east.

Road infrastructure
The B61 route (Gordon River Road) enters from the north-east and runs through to the west, following the river, until it exits. Route C609 (Lake Dobson Road) starts at an intersection with B61 and exits to the north-west.

References

Localities of Central Highlands Council
Localities of Derwent Valley Council
Towns in Tasmania